Park furniture is furniture in a park. It is often made out of iron or wood.

Description 
Park furniture is furniture in a park. It is often made out of iron or wood.

Researchers in Hong Kong wrote that park furniture is "a type of artifact to support outdoor public recreational activities and green environment where users may act fairly as stated by British Standards Institute (2005)";  this means that the furniture should be inclusive – "accessible to, and usable by, as many people as reasonably possible ... without the need for special adaptation or specialised design".

Types of park furniture 

Examples of park furniture include:

Bandstands
Benches
Chess tables
Fountains
Light fixtures
Picnic tables
Statues

Construction 
Around 1840, Janes, Beebe & Co. produced one of the earliest products of mass-produced cast-iron seating in America, an example of which is held by the Smithsonian Institution as inv. no. 1980.006. The seat is an example of furniture that appeared in public parks in the mid 19th century. 

In some jurisdictions, furniture used in public parks is made by prison inmates as part of prison work programs.

See also
Beach furniture
Garden furniture
Street furniture

References

Furniture
Garden features
Landscape architecture
Parks
Street furniture